Eugene Raymond Sullivan (born August 2, 1941) is an American lawyer who is a senior judge of the United States Court of Appeals for the Armed Forces. In 1990, President George H. W. Bush named him the chief judge. When not recalled to active court service, Sullivan is a senior partner in the Washington D.C. law firm of Freeh, Sporkin & Sullivan LLP.

Born in St. Louis, Missouri, Sullivan graduated from St. Louis University High School before matriculating to the United States Military Academy, West Point, New York, where he was a member of the Cadet Honor Committee and the varsity lacrosse team. Following graduation with a B.S. degree in 1964, he was in the Army for five years and qualified as a tanker, an airborne ranger, a ranger instructor and a jumpmaster. He was awarded the Bronze Star, the Air Medal and other decorations in Vietnam. Sullivan has been inducted into the U.S. Army Ranger Hall of Fame.

After his time in the Army, Sullivan graduated from Georgetown University Law Center with a Juris Doctor in 1971, and was an editor of the Georgetown Law Journal in his final year. After law school, Sullivan clerked for Chief Judge Marion Charles Matthes of the United States Court of Appeals for the 8th Circuit and worked for the Patton Boggs law firm in Washington, D.C..

Sullivan worked in the White House on the legal defense team of President Richard Nixon during the Watergate investigation in 1974. From 1974 to 1982, he was a trial attorney in the United States Department of Justice. From 1982 to 1986, he worked in the Pentagon as the general counsel and the chief ethics officer of the U.S. Air Force after initially being the deputy general counsel.

From 1982 until 1986, Sullivan was the general counsel of the National Reconnaissance Office, a then secret US satellite intelligence agenc). In addition, in 1984–1986, he was the governor of Wake Island, the U.S. possession in the Pacific. In 1988 and 1989, he sat on the federal commission to review the West Point Honor Code. He is a trustee emeritus and the founding chair of the ethics committee of the West Point board of trustees and was on the first executive board of the Duke University Law School Center for Law, Ethics and National Security.

Sullivan has given many lectures on American law to visiting international judges and lawyers. For many years, he was the chair of three annual conferences: the International Judicial Conference (Criminal Law), the Great Debate (a debate on judicial reform) between the US and England, and the International Diplomatic Conference. During his career in promoting the rule of law, Sullivan has been awarded the Medal of Justice from Romania, the First Class Medal of Defense from Hungary, the Defense Minister's Citation of Merit from the Republic of China, an honorary Doctor of Law degree from New England School of Law, the Air Force Exceptional Civilian Service Medal, the Medal for Outstanding Public Service from the U.S. Department of Defense, and the 2001 Castle Award from the West Point Society (DC). The Castle Award is given to one West Point graduate each year. Sullivan is a recipient of the Ellis Island Medal of Honor.

He has written two published novels, both political thrillers, The Majority Rules (2005) and The Report to the Judiciary (2008). He is the chair of the Judging Panel for the annual International Impac Dublin Literary Award (100,000 Euros for a single work of fiction).

Sullivan is married to Lis Sullivan  (née Johansen) from Ribe in Denmark, who is an artist and anthropologist (her field—bound-foot women of China). Their daughter, Kim, is a graduate of Columbia University, attended graduate school at Columbia University, and works as an ABC producer in New York City. Eugene II, their son, works as a litigator in Washington D.C. and is a graduate of Duke University, The London School of Economics and Columbia Law.

After taking senior status as a judge, Sullivan founded the Gavel Consulting Group, which consists of former federal judges (most of whom have held additional high government office). An article in The Washington Post pointed out that Sullivan's interest in a private company such as this could conflict with federal laws that prohibit judges from profiting from their office. Sullivan responded that he was no longer in active status as a judge and that this activity was permitted under the federal statute governing his court. The article also noted that Sullivan is the firm's sole owner, whereas the other members are "advisers" who have no ownership stake.

Bibliography
The Majority Rules (2004), 
The Report to the Judiciary

References

External links
Eugenesullivan.com
Gavel Consulting Group
Freeh, Sporkin & Sullivan, LLP

|-

1941 births
Living people
United States Military Academy alumni
Military personnel from Missouri
United States Army Rangers
United States Army personnel of the Vietnam War
Recipients of the Air Medal
Georgetown University Law Center alumni
Lawyers from St. Louis
General Counsels of the United States Air Force
Judges of the United States Court of Appeals for the Armed Forces
United States Article I federal judges appointed by Ronald Reagan
20th-century American judges